The  class was the last class of traditional armored cruisers built by the German  (Imperial Navy). They were larger than the s that preceded them; the extra size was used primarily to increase the main armament of 21 cm (8.2 inch) guns from four to eight. The ships were the first German cruisers to reach equality with their British counterparts. The ships were named after 19th century Prussian army reformers, Gerhard von Scharnhorst and August von Gneisenau.

Both ships had short careers; shortly before the outbreak of World War I, the ships departed the German colony at Tsingtao. On 1 November 1914, the ships destroyed a British force at the Battle of Coronel and inflicted upon the Royal Navy its first defeat since the Battle of Plattsburgh in 1814. The East Asia Squadron, including both -class ships, was subsequently annihilated at the Battle of the Falkland Islands on 8 December.

Design 

The Second Naval Law in Germany, passed in 1900, envisioned a force of fourteen armored cruisers for both service overseas in Germany's colonial empire and as scouts for the main battle fleet in German waters. The naval expansion program was primarily directed against the British Royal Navy, then the world's preeminent naval force. Germany's armored cruiser force followed a series of iterative developments based on the cruiser , and the  class represented the culmination of that evolutionary development.

During the design process for the class, the General Department issued a request that the new cruisers be capable of fighting in the line of battle in the event that German battleships were damaged and unable to continue fighting. Up to this point, this had not been a consideration in German armored cruiser construction, and so a significant increase in both firepower and armor protection would be required to accommodate it. This in turn required much larger ships, and the s were accordingly about  heavier than the preceding s. The weight increase secured a doubling of the main battery, a 50% increase in belt armor, and an increase in top speed by more than a knot over the  class. The speed increase was achieved by the addition of two boilers that provided  more power for the propulsion system. As a result of these improvements, the  class was the first German armored cruiser design that compared favorably to its foreign counterparts.

The design staff considered adding a pair of these guns to the conning tower roof abreast of the bridge, but experience with the same arrangement on the s demonstrated the excessive blast effect interfered with control of the ships, and so those guns were suppressed in the  design.

General characteristics and machinery

The ships' hulls were constructed of transverse and longitudinal steel frames, over which the outer hull plating was riveted. The vessels had 15 watertight compartments and a double bottom that ran for 50% of the length of the hull.

The ships had a standard crew of 38 officers and 726 enlisted men. , as the squadron flagship, had a larger crew, including an additional 14 officers and 62 men. , when serving as the squadron second command flagship, had an extra staff of 3 officers and 25 men. The ships carried a number of smaller vessels, including two picket boats, two launches, one pinnace, two cutters, three yawls, and one dinghy.

The -class ships used the same powerplant as in the preceding  class: three 3-cylinder triple expansion engines. The triple expansion engines were supplied with steam by 18 coal-fired marine-type boilers with 36 fire boxes. The ships had a single rudder. The vessels' electrical plant consisted of four turbo-generators that delivered 260 kilowatts at 110 volts.

Armament 

The ships' main battery armament consisted of eight  SK L/40 guns, four in twin gun turrets, one fore and one aft of the main superstructure on the centerline, and the remaining four were mounted in single casemates located amidships. The turrets were the DrL C/01 type, which was hydraulically operated, and the mounts provided a range of elevation from -5 to +30 degrees. The casemates used electric motors to train the guns, but elevation was hand-operated. The guns were supplied with a total of 700 rounds.

The secondary armament included six  SK L/40 guns in individual casemates. For close-range defense against torpedo boats, the ships carried a tertiary battery of eighteen 8.8 cm SK L/35 guns, which were mounted in individual casemates and pivot mounts in the superstructure.

As was customary for warships of the period, the -class ships were equipped with four  submerged torpedo tubes. One was mounted in the bow, one on each broadside, and the fourth was placed in the stern. The ships were supplied with a total of 11 torpedoes.

Armor 
As was the standard for German warships, the ships of the  class were protected by Krupp armor. This was a significant increase in thickness over earlier German armored cruisers. Tests at the navy's firing range at Meppen had revealed that the  belt used in all preceding designs was too thin to stop the medium-caliber shells that the cruisers would likely face in combat. The entire belt was backed with teak planking.

Ships

Service history 
At the start of World War I, the two ships were in the Caroline Islands on a routine cruise; the rest of Spee's squadron was dispersed around the Pacific. The flotilla would then attempt to return to Germany via the Atlantic Ocean. Spee also intended to attack the three British cruisers under the command of Admiral Christopher Cradock, and any British shipping encountered. On 22 September,  and  approached the island of Papeete in French Polynesia with the intention of seizing the coal stockpiled in the harbor. The ships conducted a short bombardment that resulted in the sinking of the old gunboat . However, Spee feared that the harbor had been mined, and decided to avoid the risk. The French had also set fire to the coal stocks to prevent the Germans from using the coal.

Battle of Coronel 

At approximately 17:00 on 1 November 1914, the East Asia Squadron encountered Cradock's ships off Coronel. The light cruiser  closed to point-blank range to attack ; after a severe pummeling, Monmouth sank as well. The British light cruiser  and the auxiliary cruiser  both escaped under the cover of darkness. First Sea Lord Jackie Fisher remarked that it was "the saddest naval action of the war." The defeat was the first to be inflicted on the Royal Navy since the 1814 Battle of Plattsburgh. After news of the battle reached Kaiser Wilhelm II in Berlin, he ordered 300 Iron Crosses to be awarded to the men of Spee's squadron. After refueling in Valparaiso, the East Asia Squadron departed for the Falkland Islands, in order to destroy the British wireless transmitter located there.

Battle of the Falkland Islands 

Sturdee's ships reached the Falklands by the morning of 8 December, shortly before Spee's squadron arrived. The British spotted the East Asia Squadron at 09:40; Spee was unaware that the British had sent the two battlecruisers, and when he observed them, he ordered his ships to withdraw. Despite the head start, the fast battlecruisers quickly caught up with the worn-out German ships, which had just completed a 16,000 mile voyage without repairs.

After a two-hour-long battle,  was dead in the water and listing heavily. Some 2,200 men were killed, among them Spee.

Notes

Footnotes

Citations

References

Further reading
 

Cruiser classes
 
World War I cruisers of Germany